Boris Continuum Complete is a special effects Plug-in package that works in conjunction with Adobe Creative Suite, including CS6, Avid editing and finishing systems such as: Sony Vegas Pro, and Apple Final Cut Pro.  Its effects are divided into 16 different categories: 3D Objects, Art Looks, Blur & Sharpen, Color & Tone, Film Style, Image Restoration, Key & Blend, Lights, Match Move, Particles, Perspective, Stylize, Textures, Time, Transitions and Warp.  The last version, Boris Continuum Complete 9, was released on March 20, 2014.

History
The initial Boris Continuum Complete package was created in 1995 and as a software based DVE solution for emerging NLEs. Ever since the package has expanded to include camera and light features as well.

Latest Features

FX Browser™

The FX Browser™ allows you to browse the entire BCC effects library either as a stand alone application or by trying each effect individually. The browser has a built-in browsing history that displays recent searches. The demonstrated effects are applied to moving video samples.

The Transition Group

BCC 9 delivers 24 new transitions groups: Blobs Wipe, Lens Distortion Wipe, Rings Wipe, Blur Dissolve, Lens Flare Dissolve, Ripple Dissolve, Checker Wipe, Lens Flare Round, Tile Wipe, Composite Dissolve, Lens Flare Spiked, Tritone Dissolve, Damaged TV Dissolve, Lens Flash, Twister, Film Glow Dissolve, Light Wipe, Vector Blur Dissolve, Flutter Cut, Rays Dissolve, Vignette Wipe, Grid Wipe, Ribbon Wipe, Water Waves Dissolve.

The Film Group

Added BCC Vignette. Adds luminocity and defocus controls.

BCC 2-Strip Color. Mimics the looks of classic Hollywood Films.

The Image Restoration Group

BCC Magic Sharp. Sharpens blurry images.

BCC Lens Correction. Removes fish-eye warp.

The Stylize Group

BCC Grunge and BCC Edge Grunge add grit, grime, and atmosphere to titles and clips.

The Keying and Composite Group

BCC Chromakey Studio. Creates junk mattes, green screen smoothing, final matte cleanups, chroma keying, light wraps, and color correcting.

The Lights Group

BCC Laser Beam. Engraves titles or and adds trace-on effects onto footage with fog and glows.

The Perspective Group

BCC Pan & Zoom. The rotates images in 3D and manages cropping and adjustment.

Performance Speed

Filters tested in Avid Windows platform

Effects
The latest version of Boris Continuum Complete features the following effects:

References

External links
Creative Cow Media100 Community Forums

Adobe Inc.